Dances of the Kwakiutl is a 1951 film directed by William Heick and produced by Robert Gardner. It is distributed by Documentary Educational Resources. The film is composed of sequences filmed in 1950 in Fort Rupert, British Columbia, featuring a performance by Kwakiutl people of their secretive Hamatsa ceremony.

See also
In the Land of the Head Hunters, a 1914 silent film

References
 
 Ira Jacknis. Visualizing Kwakwaka'wakw Tradition: The Films of William Heick, 1951-1963, BC STUDIES: The British Columbia Quarterly - A Special Double Issue-Number 125 & 126, 2000. 

1951 films
American short documentary films
1950s short documentary films
Anthropology documentary films
1951 documentary films
Films shot in British Columbia
Documentary films about First Nations
Kwakwaka'wakw
1950s English-language films
1950s American films